Antoine de Laroque (1672, Marseille – 3 October 1744, Paris) was an 18th-century French librettist.

Biography 
When Laroque was constable of the Royal Guard, a cannonball smashed his leg during the battle of Malplaquet, and they had to cut it off above the knee. He left the service with the Cross of  Chevalier of the Order of Saint Louis and a pension from Louis XIV.

In 1721, he took over the privilege of the Mercure de France, to which his brother Jean de Laroque also participated and perfected it, writing in collaboration with Fuzelier and Dufresny, from June 1721 up to 31 October 1744. When Dufresny died in October 1724, Laroque was left alone to administer the review and d’Antoine also participated.

He also wrote an opera, Théoné, five-act tragédie lyrique, Paris, Ribou, (1715). Abbott Pellegrin under the name Laroque gave the theater his tragedy Medée et Jason, which was even printed several times under his own name from 1716 until 1760.

Antoine Laroque was also known for being a great collector, particularly of paintings. In 1745, Gersaint, the famous art dealer of the Pont Notre-Dame, wrote a catalog of chevalier Laroque's cabinet. Among the 300 paintings from his collection were the Flight into Egypt by Paul Veronese, a St. George by Rubens, drinkers and auctioneers by Terburg, a lady by Gérard Nesscher, Bathsheba leaving her bath by Nicolas Poussin, two landscapes by Claude Lorrain, three paintings by Wouwerman, two paintings by Antoine Watteau etc. All these paintings would be sold at a modest price, probably given the disasters of France.

References

Sources 
 
 
 Antoine de Léris, Dictionnaire portatif historique et littéraire des théâtres (Leris), Paris, C. A. Jombert, .
 Joseph-Marie Quérard, La France littéraire, t. 4, Paris, Firmin Didot, 1830, .

External links 
 Antoine de Laroque on data.bnf.fr
 His plays on CÉSAR

Writers from Marseille
1672 births
18th-century French dramatists and playwrights
18th-century French journalists
French military personnel of the War of the Spanish Succession
French opera librettists
Knights of the Order of Saint Louis
1744 deaths
French art collectors